Orley Farm is a novel written in the realist mode by Anthony Trollope (1815–82), and illustrated by the Pre-Raphaelite artist John Everett Millais (1829–96). It was first published in monthly shilling parts by the London publisher Chapman and Hall. Although this novel appeared to have undersold (possibly because the shilling part was being overshadowed by magazines, such as The Cornhill, that offered a variety of stories and poems in each issue), Orley Farm became Trollope's personal favourite. George Orwell said the book contained "one of the most brilliant descriptions of a lawsuit in English fiction."

The house in the book was based on a farm in Harrow once owned by the Trollope family. The real-life farm became a school, which was originally supposed to be the feeder school to Harrow School. It was renamed Orley Farm School after the novel, with Trollope's permission.

Background
Orley Farm was written between July 1860 and June 1861. The novel was first published in monthly shilling parts by the London publisher Chapman and Hall from March 1861 to October 1862, with forty wood-engraving illustrations by John Everett Millais. Each part comprised two illustrations that were situated at the front, and two to three chapters that followed. The first volume, also published by Chapman and Hall, appeared in December 1861, before the novel's serialisation was completed. The second volume was published in September 1862, and both volumes included the illustrations.

To produce some of these volumes Chapman and Hall used the unsold parts, making the double volume set valuable for present-day collectors. While the cost for the monthly parts had been low, that for the double volume set was set at eleven shillings per volume. The standard price for such books was ten shillings, and in a letter to the publisher, Trollope blamed the increased price for slow sales of the first volume.

Trollope's arrangement with Chapman and Hall was that he would receive £125 for each of the monthly parts, a sum of £2,500, with an additional half interest in each copy sold after the first 10,000. He was paid a total of £3,135 under this agreement.

Plot summary
When Joseph Mason of Groby Park, Yorkshire, died, he left his estate to his family. A codicil to his will, however, left Orley Farm (near London) to his much younger second wife and infant son. The will and the codicil were in her handwriting, and there were three witnesses, one of whom was no longer alive. A bitterly fought court case confirmed the codicil.

Twenty years pass. Lady Mason lives at Orley Farm with her adult son, Lucius. Samuel Dockwrath, a tenant, is asked to leave by Lucius, who wants to try new intensive farming methods. Aggrieved, and knowing of the original case (John Kenneby, one of the codicil witnesses, had been an unsuccessful suitor of his wife Miriam Usbech), Dockwrath investigates and finds a second deed signed by the same witnesses on the same date, though they can remember signing only one. He travels to Groby Park in Yorkshire, where Joseph Mason the younger lives with his comically parsimonious wife, and persuades Mason to have Lady Mason prosecuted for perjury. The prosecution fails, but Lady Mason later confesses privately that she committed the forgery, and is prompted by conscience to give up the estate.

There are various subplots. The main one deals with a slowly unfolding romance between Felix Graham (a young and relatively poor barrister without family) and Madeline Staveley, daughter of Judge Stavely of Noningsby. Graham has a long-standing engagement to the penniless Mary Snow, whom he supports and educates while she is being "moulded" to be his wife.

Between the Staveleys at Alston and Orley Farm at Hamworth lies the Cleve, where Sir Peregrine Orme lives with his daughter-in-law, Mrs. Orme, and grandson, Peregrine. Sir Peregrine falls in love with Lady Mason and is briefly engaged to her, but she confesses her crime to Sir Peregine, and they call off the match.

Meanwhile, Mr. Furnival, another barrister, befriends Lady Mason, arousing the jealousy of his wife. His daughter, Sophia, has a brief relationship with Augustus Stavely and a brief engagement to Lucius Mason. Eventually Furnival and his wife are reconciled, and Sophia's engagement is dropped. Sophia is portrayed as an intelligent woman who writes comically skilful letters.

Major themes

Against a vast panorama of carefully depicted human types and their relationships, the basic themes are guilt (the different manifestations of its acknowledgment by Mary Mason and by her son), revenge (its nature and reasons as indulged in by Joseph Mason and by Samuel Dockwrath), suffering (by the guilty party herself and by others who love her), and love/hate (their respective presence or absence in individual characters among the Ormes, the Staverleys, the Furnivals, Felix Graham, and Mary Snow).

Another major theme of Orley Farm is the question of individual judgment versus group judgment. Augustus Staveley purports to advise Felix Graham that a person must allow oneself "to be governed by the united wisdom of others" rather than to take it upon oneself to "judge as to every step by his own lights."  Trollope calls this advice into question. Similarly, a comic minor character, Mr. Moulder, defends Lady Mason's acquittal thus:  "If a jury of her countrymen doesn't make a woman innocent, what does?"

A darker theme, also seen in Trollope's other books such as Castle Richmond and Framley Parsonage, is that the changing Victorian world often brought anguish and disillusionment to those who had started out with great advantages.  Another theme, which recurs often throughout Trollope's works, is the threat of the loss of a house.

Reception
Trollope has made a few comments over the background and his regard to Orley Farm. In Book IX of his autobiography, Trollope says, "The plot of Orley Farm is probably the best I have ever made; but it has the fault of declaring itself, and thus coming to an end too early in the book." He continues by admitting, "When Lady Mason tells Sir Peregrine that she did forge the will, the plot of Orley Farm has unraveled itself; – and this she does in the middle of the tale."

Notes

References
 Oxford Reader's Companion to Trollope. ed. R.C. Terry. Oxford University Press. 1999. 622 pp. 
 Cockshut, A. O. J. Anthony Trollope: A Critical Study. New York University Press. 1968. 256 pp.
 Epperly, Elizabeth R. Patterns of Repetition in Trollope. Catholic University of America Press. 1989. 238 pp.
 Lansbury, Coral. The Reasonable Man: Trollope's Legal Fiction. Princeton University Press. 1981. 228 pp.

External links 
 
 
 

1861 British novels
Novels set in England
Novels by Anthony Trollope
Chapman & Hall books